St. Michael and All Angels Church was constructed from 1888 to 1891 of brick at the Blantyre Mission in Blantyre, Malawi. It is located on the original Scottish mission site, off Chileka Rd, and is in the Church of Central Africa, Presbyterian’s Blantyre Synod. Since 1991, it has been partnered with Hiland Presbyterian Church in Pittsburgh, Pennsylvania. In 1885, Lieutenant H. E. O'Neil determined the longitude of Blantyre to be 2 hours 20 minutes 13.56 seconds east of Greenwich by means of a series of 365 sets of lunar observations, and a plaque installed in the side of the church commemorates this achievement. The church has been described as
the first permanent Christian Church erected ... between the Zambezi and the Nile. – Rev. Alexander Hetherwick C.B.E., D.D., F.R.G.S.

Construction
The church was designed, and its construction managed, by Rev. David Clement Scott, who had no formal architectural training. Labor was provided by local men without previous experience in this type of construction. All the bricks used were made on-site from local clay and fired in wood-fueled kilns. It has been estimated that eighty-one different forms of bricks were used in the building. The most common bricks are 12 by 6 by 3 inches, laid up in English bond.

Scott made no detailed drawings before construction began. Instead, each detail was tested with dry bricks before final assembly. The dimensions are approximately 106 feet long, 30 feet wide from aisle wall to aisle wall, and 37 feet high to the crest of the roof. Scott described his plan thus:
The form was a Latin cross with very short transepts, (10 feet outside measurement). A short choir, (12 feet outside measurement), and a semi-circular apse of 8 feet radius. The aim was to make a comely Presbyterian place of worship.

Design and structural elements include arches, domes, and flying buttresses. The two towers are not identical. A Moorish, domed bell tower, which contains a circular staircase, is built into the angle between the south-western tower and the wall of the south aisle. The interior consists of a Byzantine arcade of six arches.

Modifications and renovations
An organ was installed in the North transept in 1907, and electric light was installed in 1912. The organ was replaced in 1954. The church underwent renovations in the 1970s, but has changed little in appearance since it was built. A large crack was found and repaired with flitch plates and turnbuckles.

Surroundings
The church building itself is accompanied by a clock tower, about 30 yards to the north, and is surrounded by additional buildings that at one time housed a school, a hospital,
a printing press, and a carpentry shop. The grounds now include both a modern multi-purpose hall and the Henry Henderson Institute, named in honour of the Scottish missionary Henry Henderson (1843–91).

Gallery

References

External links
Church of Central Africa Presbyterian’s Blantyre Synod
Dictionary of African Christian Biography: David Clement Scott

Churches in Malawi
Churches completed in 1891
19th-century Presbyterian churches
Buildings and structures in Blantyre